Anthospermopsis is a monotypic genus of flowering plants in the family Rubiaceae. It was described by Joseph Harold Kirkbride Jr. in 1997. The genus contains only one species, viz. Anthospermopsis catechosperma, which is endemic to Bahia, Brazil.

References

External links
Anthospermopsis in the World Checklist of Rubiaceae

Monotypic Rubiaceae genera
Spermacoceae